This is a list of countries by feldspar production in 2019 based on British Geological Survey data.

References

		

Lists of countries by mineral production
Feldspar
Feldspar mining